Andrzej Krzeptowski (29 July 1903 – 26 February 1946) was a Polish skier. He competed at the 1924 Winter Olympics and the 1928 Winter Olympics.

References

1903 births
1946 deaths
Polish male cross-country skiers
Polish male Nordic combined skiers
Polish male ski jumpers
Olympic cross-country skiers of Poland
Olympic Nordic combined skiers of Poland
Olympic ski jumpers of Poland
Cross-country skiers at the 1924 Winter Olympics
Nordic combined skiers at the 1924 Winter Olympics
Ski jumpers at the 1924 Winter Olympics
Ski jumpers at the 1928 Winter Olympics
Sportspeople from Zakopane
20th-century Polish people